Cat Creek is a stream in Grundy and Harrison counties in the U.S. state of Missouri. It is a tributary of the Thompson River.

The stream flows south to southeast passing through the Wayne Hellton Memorial Wildlife Area. It then turns to the east, crosses under Missouri Route CC and enters northwest Grundy County approximately 1.5 miles west of its confluence with the Thompson River.

Cat Creek may have been named for the wildcats in the area.

See also
List of rivers of Missouri

References

Rivers of Grundy County, Missouri
Rivers of Harrison County, Missouri
Rivers of Missouri